Yantzaza is a town in the Zamora Chinchipe province of Ecuador. It is the seat of the Yantzaza Canton.

General Information 
Yantzaza, with 10,528 people, is the second highest populated city of the province. It is also the province's principal economic and commercial center. It is located 42 kilometers (about 23 miles) from the city Zamora and is near the Zamora River's bank, on the Yantzaza Valley or Valley of Fireflies (Spanish: Valle de Yantzaza o Valle de las Luciérnagas). The origin of its name comes from the word yanzatza in Shuar which means "valley of the fireflies," due to the constant presence of fireflies in the area. In the outskirts and surroundings of the city there is an intense form of stock breeding and an extensive strip mining system which supplies the local and national markets.

Tourism 
One of the more common tourist attractions for local inhabitants as well as foreign visitors is the discovery of marine shell fossils in the major avenue of the city, Avenue Iván Riofrío. The Central Park consists of plants and the native flower shrubs.

The most prominent building of the city is the new Illustrious City Hall of Yantzaza (Spanish: Ilustre Municipalidad de Yantzaza). There are other private buildings, which are the tallest in the city.

There are several hotels in the area, including Hotel Galaxy, Hotel Oriental, Hotel Sebastians, Hotel Inca, Amazonas, Yanku, and Central.

Other amenities include the Ottawa Recreational Center (Spanish: el Centro Recreacional Ottawa) whose services include a pool, sports court, and restaurant. Also nearby is the Municipal Sports Center (Spanish: el Complejo Deportivo Municipal) which is located towards the northern part of the city on Avenue Jaime Roldos Augilera. There are also guest houses like Tierra Dorada, Playa Verde, and El Ayantay which each have pools, Turkish baths, and hot-tubs in addition to traditional dishes like tilapia.

In Quiringue, located 13 kilometers (about 8 miles) from Yantzaza, visitors can learn more about hand-woven fabrics. These fabrics are woven with the rare thread made from silk worms.

References

External links

 www.inec.gov.ec / Yantzaza Canton

Populated places in Zamora-Chinchipe Province